The Water Office is a former warehouse at 1 Donegall Square, Belfast, Northern Ireland, that is listed by the Northern Ireland Department for Communities at grade B1, citing both "Historic Interest" and "Architectural Interest".

History
It was built between 1860 and 1879 in an Italian Gothic style to the designs of William H. Lynn for Richardson Sons and Owden, linen merchants. It became the offices of the Belfast City and District Water Commissioners before the Second World War during which it was badly damaged by German bombing, and later a shop for Marks & Spencer.

References

External links 

Belfast City and District Water Commissioners
Listed buildings in Northern Ireland
Listed warehouses in the United Kingdom
Buildings and structures completed in 1879
William Henry Lynn buildings
Commercial buildings in Northern Ireland
19th-century architecture in Northern Ireland